Martin Dermott (born 25 September 1967) is an English former professional rugby league footballer who played as a  in the 1980s and 1990s, and was capped 11 times for Great Britain.

He played for Wigan and the Warrington Wolves.

Background
Martin Dermott was born in Wigan, Lancashire, England.

Playing career
Martin Dermott played  in Wigan's 15-8 victory over Oldham in the 1986 Lancashire Cup Final during the 1986–87 season at Knowsley Road, St. Helens, on Sunday 19 October 1986, played  in the 22-17 victory over Salford in the 1988 Lancashire Cup Final during the 1988–89 season at Knowsley Road, St. Helens on Sunday 23 October 1988, and played  in the 5-4 victory over St. Helens in the 1992 Lancashire Cup Final during the 1992–93 season at Knowsley Road, St. Helens on Sunday 18 October 1992.

Martin Dermott played  in Wigan's 18-4 victory over Warrington in the 1986–87 John Player Special Trophy Final during the 1986–87 season at Burnden Park, Bolton on Saturday 10 January 1987, played  in the 12-6 victory over Widnes in the 1988–89 John Player Special Trophy Final during the 1988–89 season at Burnden Park, Bolton on Saturday 7 January 1989, played  in the 24-12 victory over Halifax in the 1989–90 Regal Trophy Final during the 1989–90 season at Headingley, Leeds on Saturday 13 January 1990, played  in the 15-8 victory over Bradford Northern in the 1992–93 Regal Trophy Final during the 1992–93 season at Elland Road, Leeds on Saturday 23 January 1993, and played  in the 2-33 defeat by Castleford in the 1993–94 Regal Trophy Final during the 1993–94 season at Elland Road, Leeds on Saturday 22 January 1994.

He was selected to go on the 1992 Great Britain Lions tour of Australia and New Zealand.

References

External links
!Great Britain Statistics at englandrl.co.uk (statistics currently missing due to not having appeared for both Great Britain, and England)
Profile at wigan-warriors.com

1967 births
Living people
English rugby league players
Great Britain national rugby league team players
Lancashire rugby league team players
Rugby league hookers
Rugby league players from Wigan
Warrington Wolves players
Wigan Warriors players